Sven Göran Mikaelsson (born 5 December 1943 in Tärnaby) is a Swedish former alpine skier who competed in the 1972 Winter Olympics.

External links
 sports-reference.com

1943 births
Swedish male alpine skiers
Alpine skiers at the 1972 Winter Olympics
Olympic alpine skiers of Sweden
People from Storuman Municipality
Living people
Sportspeople from Västerbotten County
20th-century Swedish people